The Royal Australian Army Educational Corps (RAAEC) is a specialist corps within the Australian Army. Formed in 1949, the corps had its genesis in other services that existed within the Australian forces during World War I and World War II. It is currently made up entirely of commissioned officers and is responsible for the provision of education-related services within the Army. Its various roles include instruction, designing computer-based learning materials, instructional systems, language training, literacy, and numeracy.

History
The RAAEC was established in September 1949 as the Australian Army Educational Corps and was granted Royal assent in 1960. Consisting of the Crown and a boomerang upon which the corps' initials are inscribed superimposed over a "fluted flambeau of flames", the current RAAEC corps badge was adopted in 1964. It is the only corps badge in the Australian Army where the crown does not appear at the top and is based on the badge devised for the Royal Army Educational Corps by King George VI in 1949.

The corps grew out of the Australian Army Education Service (AAES), which was established on 29 October 1943 during World War II, under the command of Colonel Robert Madgwick. Through the AAES, the corps draws its lineage from the Australian Army Education Scheme, which was established under Madgwick on 5 March 1941. That scheme itself was based loosely upon a vocational education scheme that had been established during World War I within the Australian Imperial Force in 1918 under George Merrick Long, as part of the demobilisation and repatriation process.

Throughout its history, the corps has deployed members to support Australian forces deployed on operations. Initially, they deployed to Japan as part of the British Commonwealth Occupation Force, where they provided education support for service personnel and their children. Later, members of the corps were sent to Korea during the Korean War, where they were attached at battalion level to provide soldiers with training in the field. During the Vietnam War, RAAEC personnel were deployed to support the 1st Australian Task Force at Nui Dat.

Throughout its history, the corps has also provided short and long-term courses to enlisted soldiers. Short-term courses have been developed internally by education staff, while some long-term courses were accredited with external authorities. In Australia during the 1960s and 1970s, many education courses were provided to soldiers as aq requirement for promotion to a higher rank. At the same time, In the (former) Territory of Papua New Guinea, Australian National Servicemen in the education corps provided courses in literacy, numeracy, and citizenship to non-commissioned ranks at various army barracks.

Current role and structure
The RAAEC is responsible for many educational areas of military training, including the development and implementation of technology and communications training at the Royal Military College, Duntroon and the Australian Defence Force Academy, managing and conducting long-distance education, teaching English to foreign students, analysing education proposals, developing training, and delivering literacy and numeracy and "train the trainer" programs to non-commissioned officers (NCOs) on promotion courses.

Currently, the corps is made up entirely of commissioned officers in the specialist service officer/professionally qualified stream, although in the past the RAAEC has had some NCOs allocated to it. The majority of the corps' personnel are civil qualified teachers; however, additional information technology specialists have been laterally recruited to manage the computer-based learning packages within the Army Learning Production Centre.

Members of the RAAEC are posted to a number of locations including:
 Headquarters Forces Command – Army: Sydney;
 Army Learning Production Centre (ALPC): Sydney, Brisbane, Albury/Wodonga;
 Defence International Training Centre (DITC): Laverton, Victoria;
 Various major training establishments in Victoria, New South Wales, Canberra and Queensland;
 Individual training centres, located in every state;
 Some overseas locations, including positions as language advisors.

The current Colonel-in-Chief of the RAAEC is The Duchess of Gloucester. The current Head of the Corps is Colonel Anita Rynne.

Notes

References

Order of precedence

Educational
Australian army units with royal patronage
1949 establishments in Australia
Military education and training in Australia
Military units and formations established in 1949